is one of the Tokara Islands, belonging to Kagoshima Prefecture. The island covers 27.66 km² in area and has a population of 48 people. Although the island has an airport, there are no regularly scheduled services, and access is normally by ferry to the city of Kagoshima on the mainland. The island is about nine hours by boat from the mainland. The islanders are dependent mainly on agriculture, fishing and seasonal tourism.

Geography
The local climate is classified as subtropical, with a rainy season from May through September.

History
Suwanosejima has been populated sporadically (depending on volcanic activity), for several thousand years.  The island was once part of the Ryukyu Kingdom. During the Edo period, Suwanosejima was part of Satsuma Domain and was administered as part of Kawanabe District.

It was abandoned after a great 15th century eruption, until it was resettled by people of the Amami Islands in the 19th century. After large-scale Plinian eruptions from 1813-1814, which ejected a large amount of scoria and saw lava flows to the west coast, the island was abandoned by its inhabitants again until 1883.
Further eruptions occurred in 1877, 1914-1915, 1921, 1922-1925, 1938, 1940, 1949, 1950-1954, 1957-1999, 2001-2002 and 2004-present. One of the most active volcanic islands in the world, Suwanosejima recorded 156 volcanic eruptions in 2008 and 216 in 2009.

In 1896, the island was transferred to the administrative control of Ōshima District, Kagoshima, and from 1911 was administered as part of the village of Toshima, Kagoshima. From 1946-1952, the island was administered by the United States as part of the Provisional Government of Northern Ryukyu Islands.

It is the home of Buzoku, also called the Banyan Ashram, a commune founded in the 1960s by Sansei Yamao, Nanao Sakaki, and others, and home for a while to American poet and scholar Gary Snyder.

See also
 List of volcanoes in Japan

References

Bibliography
 National Geospatial Intelligence Agency (NGIA). Prostar Sailing Directions 2005 Japan Enroute. Prostar Publications (2005). 
 Das, Bhagavan (1997). It's Here Now (Are You?) Broadway. 
 Halper, Jon, ed. Gary Snyder: Dimensions of a Life (1991) Sierra Club Books. 
 Shurtleff, William and Aoyagi, Akiko (1998). The Book of Tofu. 
 Snyder, Gary. The Gary Snyder Reader (1999) Counterpoint.

External links 

 Suwanosejima - Toshima Village Official Website 
 Suwanosejima - Japan Meteorological Agency 
  - Japan Meteorological Agency
 Suwanose Jima - Geological Survey of Japan
 

Tokara Islands
Volcanoes of Kagoshima Prefecture
Active volcanoes
Stratovolcanoes of Japan
Islands of Kagoshima Prefecture
Holocene stratovolcanoes